Thierry Gerbier (21 September 1965 – 13 November 2013) was a French biathlete. He competed at the 1988 Winter Olympics and the 1992 Winter Olympics.

References

1965 births
2013 deaths
French male biathletes
Olympic biathletes of France
Biathletes at the 1988 Winter Olympics
Biathletes at the 1992 Winter Olympics
Sportspeople from Chambéry